3-Bromomethylphenidate (3-Br-MPH) is a compound from the phenidate family, which has reportedly been sold as a designer drug. It showed the most potent binding to the dopamine transporter of a series of ring-substituted methylphenidate derivatives, and produced stimulant effects in animal studies.

See also 
 3,4-Dichloromethylphenidate
 4-Fluoromethylphenidate
 4-Methylmethylphenidate
 Methylnaphthidate

References 

2-Benzylpiperidines
Carboxylate esters
Designer drugs
Methyl esters
Norepinephrine–dopamine reuptake inhibitors
Stimulants
2-Piperidinyl compounds